Philip Sheldrake  is a religious historian and theologian with additional background in philosophy and political theory. His main work has been as a leading scholar in the overall multi-disciplinary field of spirituality. In particular, Philip Sheldrake has been closely involved internationally in the emergence of Christian Spirituality as an academic discipline.
Sheldrake is a past president of the international Society for the Study of Christian Spirituality, linked to the American Academy of Religion (AAR).
He has written or edited seventeen books, with another book pending, as well as numerous book essays and journal articles. His publications have mainly focused on the meaning of "spirituality", the interface of spirituality and religious history and spirituality in relation to contemporary society and culture. He has also written on the theme of human and religious reconciliation and, more recently, on a spiritual vision for cities in dialogue with history, philosophy, theology, social sciences and urban studies. Sheldrake recently published a book (2019) which offers a contextual study of the theology of Julian of Norwich, the Fourteenth Century English mystical writer and the first woman known to have written in English. He is currently working on a sequel to his city book concerning the cultivation of critical public virtues with a chapter on the nature of public leadership and what makes the "good leader". 

Sheldrake originally trained in history, philosophy, and then theology at the University of Oxford and the University of London. He was also a member of the Jesuits (a Roman Catholic religious order) for some thirty years. Sheldrake taught at the University of London  (1984–94) where he was also co-director and then director of the Institute of Spirituality at Heythrop College. He later taught at the University of Cambridge (1992–97), Durham University (as William Leech Professorial Fellow 2003-08) and as honorary professor and postgraduate research supervisor at the University of Wales Lampeter (1998–2013). He was also the Hulsean Lecturer at the University of Cambridge (1999–2000) and an honorary research fellow of the Centre for the Study of Cities & Regions, Durham University (2008–2013).

Sheldrake is a Fellow of the Royal Society of Arts (FRSA) and a Fellow of the Royal Historical Society (FRHistS).  In 2015 he was awarded the higher doctorate, Doctor of Divinity (DD), by Oxford University after formal examination of a portfolio of his published work. He is currently senior research associate of the Von Hugel Institute at St Edmund's College, University of Cambridge, senior research fellow in the Cambridge Theological Federation (Westcott House) and professor and director of the Institute for the Study of Contemporary Spirituality at the graduate Oblate School of Theology, San Antonio Texas. He also remains a Professorial Fellow of St Chad's College, Durham University and is currently research fellow in the Global Cities Initiative at Georgetown University, Washington DC. He has regularly been a visiting professor or consultant at a number of other universities in the United States, for example as The Joseph Visiting Professor of Catholic Studies at Boston College (2008–09). Sheldrake has also been involved in adult continuing education and Church-related continuing ministerial training in the United Kingdom, the United States, Canada and Norway. 

Philip Sheldrake spent a year studying in India (1981–1982), where he developed an interest in Eastern religions. In recent years, he has been involved internationally in interreligious dialogue as a member of the Guerrand-Hermes Forum for the Interreligious Study of Spirituality and more recently as a participant in the annual international Building Bridges Christian-Muslim meetings, administered by Georgetown University, Washington DC. He has also worked in the United Kingdom and the United States with urban theorists, architects, urban planners and urban leadership in thinking about the meaning and future of cities and with medical professionals in the UK, US and Norway in relation to the spirituality of healthcare.

Selected works

Books

 Sheldrake, Philip (1995). Living Between Worlds: Place and Journey in Celtic Christianity. London: Darton, Longman & Todd. .
 Sheldrake, Philip (1999). Spirituality and Theology: Christian Living and the Doctrine of God. Maryknoll, NY: Orbis Books. .

 Sheldrake, Philip (2009). Heaven in Ordinary: A George Herbert Reader. London: Canterbury Press.
 Sheldrake, Philip (2010). Explorations in Spirituality: History, Theology and Social Practice. New York: Paulist Press.
 Sheldrake, Philip (2012). Spirituality: A Very Short Introduction. Oxford: Oxford University Press. 
 Sheldrake, Philip (2014). Spirituality: A Guide for the Perplexed. London: Bloomsbury. 
 Sheldrake, Philip (2014). The Spiritual City: Theology, Spirituality & the Urban. Oxford: Wiley-Blackwell. 
 Sheldrake, Philip (3rd revised edition 2016). Befriending Our Desires. Collegeville: Liturgical Press. 
 Sheldrake, Philip (2019). Julian of Norwich - in God's Sight: Her Theology in Context. Oxford: Wiley-Blackwell.
 Sheldrake, Philip (2019). The Spiritual Way: Classic Traditional and Contemporary Practice. Collegeville: Liturgical Press

Articles

References

External links
Faculty page (Durham University)
Biography page (Georgetown University)

Living people
English Christian theologians
Alumni of the University of London
Year of birth missing (living people)
Fellows of the Royal Historical Society